Sidney Fergus Macrae Yeates (20 August 1912 – 19  March 1992) was an Australian cricketer. He was a right-handed batsman and leg-break, googly bowler. He played 3 first-class cricket matches for Queensland between 1933 and 1934, scoring 46 runs and taking 6 wickets.

References

External links
 

1912 births
Australian cricketers
Queensland cricketers
Sportsmen from Queensland
1992 deaths
20th-century Australian people